Gretna High School is a public high school in Gretna, Virginia. Average attendance is 650 students per year. Between 2008 and 2010, it was renovated along with other Pittsylvania County schools: Tunstall Sr. High School, Dan River High School, and Chatham High School.

Gretna High School has won five Virginia football state championships since 2003.

Clubs
Gretna High School has several clubs, including:
 Beta Club
 Bible Club
 French Club
 Spanish Club
 Yearbook
 Science Club
 Drama Club
 Table Top Club
 FBLA
 FCCLA
 DECA
 SCA
 FFA
 ACE

Sports
Gretna High School has many sports teams, including:
 Cross-Country
 Track
 Football
 Basketball
 Volleyball
 Golf
 Baseball
 Softball
 Cheerleading

References

External links
 Official Website

Public high schools in Virginia
Schools in Pittsylvania County, Virginia